Green Card Fever is a 2003 Indian Independent film written and directed by Bala Rajasekharuni. The film starred Deep Katdare and Purva Bedi.
The film was distributed by Net Effect Media and released worldwide following a series of film festival runs. The film was entirely shot in Columbus, Ohio.
 The film was nominated for "Best Political Film of 2003" in the "Exposé" category by the Political Film Society.

Plot
The film depicts the trials and tribulations associated with obtaining a green card in the United States, exploring the secret underworld surrounding the immigration system and legal complexities that await undocumented immigrants.  Green Card Fever explores the dynamics between immigrants from various countries of origin, and generations. Primarily the plot centers around Indian immigrants but involves Argentinians, Chinese, and the Middle-Eastern immigrants along the way, depicting the present United States as a transnational America. The film is dubbed as a romantic comedy but in substance it has more to offer.

References

2003 films
2000s Hindi-language films
Films about Indian Americans
Indian independent films
Films by Desi directors
2000s English-language films